Aude, or Alda, Alde, was the sister of Oliver and betrothed of Roland in The Song of Roland, and other chansons de geste. The story of her engagement to Roland is told in Girart de Vienne.

In The Song of Roland Aude is first mentioned by her brother Oliver when he tells Roland that the two will never be married, when the two counts are arguing before the battle; they are later reconciled, but both die fighting the Saracens. When Charlemagne returns to Aix and informs Aude that Roland has died, she collapses at the Emperor's feet and dies of grief.

"The Lovely Alda" is part of Edward MacDowell's 1891 orchestral composition, Two Fragments after the Song of Roland.

References

Characters in The Song of Roland
Female characters in literature